Frug may refer to:
Frug (surname)
 Frugging, fundraising technique 
 The Frug, dance
 "Rich Man's Frug", musical number from Sweet Charity
Frenchie Pug
Frug, a track from The Initial Friend E.P.  by Rilo Kiley
A fictional character in S.W.O.R.D.